Yel Cheshmeh-ye Sofla (also Romanized as Yel Cheshmeh-ye Soflá; also known as Yel Cheshmeh-ye Pā’īn) is a village in Zavkuh Rural District, Pishkamar District, Kalaleh County, Golestan Province, Iran. At the 2006 census, its population was 1,205, in 227 families.

References 

Populated places in Kalaleh County